Watertown (subtitled A Love Story) is a studio album by American singer Frank Sinatra, released in March 1970 through Reprise Records. It is a concept album centered on a man from Watertown, New York. In a series of soliloquies, the nameless narrator tells his heartbreaking story of personal loss: his wife has left him and their two boys for the lure of the big city. Watertown was produced and co-written by Bob Gaudio, one of four members of the rock band the Four Seasons, with Jake Holmes also co-writing the songs. It is the only album where Sinatra ever voiced over pre-recorded orchestral tracks. The album was released to mixed critical reviews and poor sales, with it being Sinatra's only major album release not to chart inside the top 100 of the Billboard 200. It has since been reevaluated and many consider it to be among his finest albums.

History and recording
In 1969, Sinatra's sales were low. To try to combat this, he agreed to record a concept album with Bob Gaudio and Frankie Valli of the Four Seasons and singer-songwriter Jake Holmes. Sinatra was no stranger to concept albums, having done them in the past, such as In the Wee Small Hours in 1955. Gaudio and Valli brought Sinatra a fully written album that told the story of a man raising his two young sons in Watertown after his wife leaves him for the city.

The album's orchestral tracks were recorded in New York at Columbia 30th Street Studio, also referred to as "The Church." Unlike previous work, Sinatra did not record with the orchestra, but he did attend the recording sessions for the music. He recorded his vocals over the pre-recorded tracks at United/Western Studios on Sunset Boulevard in Hollywood. He would never again record his vocals without a live orchestra. (He overdubbed his vocals on pre-recorded tracks for "The Saddest Thing of All" as well as the songs with women's names arranged by Nelson Riddle including "Nancy," "Emily," "Linda," "Barbara," and "Sweet Lorraine." See "Put Your Dreams Away: A Frank Sinatra Discography" by Luis Carlos do Nascimento Silva)

Recording for the music took place from July 14 to 17 and October 13. Tracks 5 and 10 were recorded on July 14, tracks 1,4, and 6 on July 15, tracks 8 and 9 on July 16, and 3,7, and 11 on July 17. "Michael and Peter," "Lady Day" and "For a While" were rerecorded October 13.

Sinatra recorded his vocals in California from August 25 to 27 and October 31. Tracks 5,9,10, and 11 were recorded on August 25, 1 and 8 on August 26, and 2 and 7 on August 27. Sinatra went back into the studio on October 31 to finish vocals for "Elizabeth," "Michael and Peter," and "For a While" after not finishing them in August.

"I Would Be in Love (Anyway)" reached #77 in the Canadian pop charts, and #39 in the A.C. charts.

Story
The album is told in two parts with an epilogue. Part 1 is tracks 1-5 and tells the story of the main character's disbelief in his wife leaving. Part 2 is tracks 6-10 and tells of the main character's desperation. A 1994 CD bonus track "Lady Day" tells the story of his wife leaving Watertown for the city.

Jake Holmes, the lyricist, explained the story of each track to Ed O'Brien for the liner notes:

Part 1

1. "Watertown": It was the set-up for everything that followed. I had in mind as a model "Lazy Afternoon." I wanted a languid feeling. If we had done the TV special, it would have opened it up, with the credits going by.

2. "Goodbye (She Quietly Says)": I had a line in my head. "There was no tempest in the tea." That's what led me there. I love the idea of those kind of goodbyes that people have where nothing is happening emotionally. It knocks me out when there is nothing on the surface. People are just sitting in a coffee shop and devastation has happened. They don't articulate their feelings. Instead, they are putting sugar in their coffee and spooning cake. They are having a quiet conversation but meanwhile a life is coming apart.

3. "For a While": I've always felt that there is that moment in your life when you forget about something that is really terrible. For five minutes the sun is shining and everything is beautiful. Then all of a sudden you realize that the person you cared about is gone, and it all comes back. It is one of those horrible things about grief – one of those little holes in grief when it becomes even more painful.

4. "Michael & Peter": I had lost a child in my first marriage. I would have had a child by myself if I could have (laughs). I desperately wanted kids. In a funny kind of way, Gaudio's kids were the models for that song. I put it in letter form, because it was the only way the guy could articulate those sentiments to her.

5. "I Would Be in Love (Anyway)": I guess it's that you can't regret where you are even if life takes you someplace where you don't want to be. In a strange kind of way, it was this guy trying to let go of this woman without being angry with her. You know, throughout the story, he was never really angry at her. He kind of understood; she had to go.

Part 2

6. "Elizabeth." It was real simple. I just love that name. Bobby was writing the song and that word just fell into the melody. I just imagined a girl named Elizabeth and wrote words that were a tribute to her.

7. "What a Funny Girl (You Used to Be).": The album could have been a little bit maudlin and dour. I was trying to put a little bit of sunlight everywhere I could. It was a retrospective song. I also wanted to indicate in the song that they had been childhood sweethearts. I wanted that kind of an idea. They were probably kids together. I wanted to give the sense that they had gone to school together. They had fallen in love and married quite young.

8. "What's Now Is Now." There is in that song an indication that she had obviously gone with somebody else. She has had a relationship, and he hadn't been able to accept it. That is partially what drove her off to the big city. There is a guilt theme in that song. It is the song that opens up the story.

9. "She Says." The song is a triple turn to me. He is suspicious of the small talk. The kids are echoing his fears. Why is she sending this letter? What is going on? It is such good news; they can't believe it and they don't trust it. The twist is her saying, "She's comin' home." They don't trust that either.

10. "The Train": ... is the story. We find out that he really didn't communicate anything to her, and she isn't coming back. Although we're getting all of this story from him, she never got any of this. If she had heard this album, she might have come home. She never saw this side of him. When I think about this in retrospect, there is so much that is not done. There is so much that is unfinished. It gives the story a very deep resonance.

Epilogue

11. "Lady Day." I saw the woman as someone who had talent. She wanted to be an artist or a singer. He was a hometown person. His whole orientation was family and business. He was the kind of guy who really lived in Watertown. She was more restless – a more contemporary woman. She wanted to do other things. She wasn't liberated enough to tell him, and she didn't think he'd understand. He was basically a good guy, but she wanted more. She abandoned her family and went for a career. The postscript was whether or not she got it and was it worth it.

Track listing
"Watertown" – 3:36
"Goodbye (She Quietly Says)" – 3:06
"For a While" – 3:09
"Michael & Peter" – 5:10
"I Would Be in Love (Anyway)" – 2:31
"Elizabeth" – 3:38
"What a Funny Girl (You Used to Be)" – 3:00
"What's Now Is Now" – 4:04
"She Says" – 1:51
"The Train" – 3:26
1994 CD bonus track
"Lady Day" – 2:472022 CD bonus tracks
"Lady Day" (11/7/69)*
"Watertown" (Session Take)*
"Goodbye (She Quietly Says) (Session Take)*
"The Train" (Session Take)*
"Lady Day" (11/7/69) (Session Take)*
1970 Reprise Radio Promo #1*
1970 Reprise Radio Promo #2*

All songs written by Bob Gaudio and Jake Holmes

Personnel
Frank Sinatra – lead vocals
Bob Gaudio – producer, composer, arranger
Jake Holmes – lyricist
Charles Calello – arranger, conductor
Joe Scott – arranger, conductor
Wayne Andre, Warren Covington, Urbie Green, Jimmy Knepper – trombone
Tony Studd – bass trombone
Ray Alonge, James Buffington, Brooks Tillotson – French horn
Phil Bodner, Wally Kane, Romeo Penque, William Slapin – woodwinds
Mannie Green, Max Cahn, Julius Held, Joe Malin, George Ockner, Rocco Pesile, Raoul Poliakin, Aaron Rosand, Max Pollikoff, Tosha Samaroff, Julius Schachter, Hemi Aubert – violin
Alfred Brown, Harold Coletta, Richard Dickler, Cal Fleisig – viola
George Ricci, Harvey Shapiro – cello
Margaret Ross – harp
Dick Hyman, Moe Wechsler – piano
Stuart Scharf – classic guitar
Jay Berliner, Ralph Casale, Willard Suyker, Vincent Bell – guitar
Richard Davis, Russell George – bass
Joe Mack – electric bass
Alvin Rogers – drums
David Carey – percussion
James Rocco, Diane Dell – background vocals
Manny Green – concert master
Lee Herschberg – digital mastering, mixing
Roy Cicala – editing, remixing
Frank Laico – engineer
Don Snyder – album design
Ove Olsen – pen & ink cover art
Ed O'Brien – CD liner notes 
Joe McEwen – reissue supervisor

Charts

References

External links
Ed O'Brien interviews Watertown Lyricist Jake Holmes and Composer/Producer Bob Gaudio
A more unorthodox take on the album's central concept from Frankosonic
A podcast analysis of Watertown

1970 albums
Concept albums
Frank Sinatra albums
Reprise Records albums
Albums conducted by Charles Calello
Albums arranged by Charles Calello
Albums arranged by Bob Gaudio